The Niagara Falls International Rainbow Bridge, commonly known as the Rainbow Bridge, is an arch bridge across the Niagara River gorge. It connects the cities of Niagara Falls, New York, United States (to the east), and Niagara Falls, Ontario, Canada (west).

Construction
The Rainbow Bridge was built near the site of the earlier Honeymoon Bridge, which collapsed on January 27, 1938, due to an ice jam in the river.
A joint Canadian and American commission had been considering a new bridge to replace it, and the collapse added urgency to the project.

A design by architect Richard (Su Min) Lee was chosen (and used again for the Lewiston-Queenston Bridge, approximately  downriver). The bridge's Rainbow Tower and Canadian plaza are the work of Canadian architect William Lyon Somerville. King George VI and Queen Elizabeth, during their visit to Niagara Falls as part of the 1939 royal tour of Canada, dedicated the site of the Rainbow Bridge; a monument was erected to commemorate the occasion. Construction began in May 1940. The bridge officially opened on November 1, 1941.

The origin of the bridge's name is unknown, with one possible source being T. B. McQuesten, then chairman of the Niagara Parks Commission. An engraving on the Canadian side of the bridge includes a biblical quote from the Book of Genesis which references a "bow in the clouds." Regardless of its origin, the NRBC used the name as early as March 1939.

Description and specifications 
The New York State Department of Transportation designates the bridge as NY 955A, an unsigned reference route, while the Ontario Ministry of Transportation designates it as part of Highway 420 (and the original routing of the Queen Elizabeth Way), even though it is separated from the rest of the route by a regional road. On the American side, a number of state and national routes end at a set of intersections in front of the bridge. New York routes 104 and 384, as well as the northern section of the Niagara Scenic Parkway, all terminate at the final intersection before the bridge, and none of the designations passes onto the bridge. U.S. Route 62 terminates two blocks north at route 104, which then continues to the bridge. The Rainbow Tower, part of the plaza complex on the Canadian side, houses a large carillon, which plays several times daily.

The Rainbow Bridge does not permit commercial trucks; the nearest border crossing accessible to trucks is the Lewiston-Queenston Bridge.

Tolls 

For each pedestrian or bicyclist, the toll to cross the bridge is $1.00 USD or CAD. The pedestrian toll is collected by an automatic turnstile when leaving Canada, payable in USD or CAD quarters or $1 CAD 'loonies'. Change machines are available from $1 and $5 USD bills and $1 (loonies) and $2 (toonies) CAD coins.

For personal automobiles, the toll is only collected when leaving the United States and entering Canada. As of August 2022, car tolls are $5.00 USD or $6.50 CAD.

Gallery

Cityscape

See also
 List of crossings of the Niagara River
 List of reference routes in New York
 List of bridges in Canada
 List of bridges in the United States by height

References

External links

 Niagara Falls Bridge Commission
  Google Maps view of Rainbow Bridge
  Live Traffic Camera of Rainbow Bridge
 Images from the Historic Niagara Digital Collections
 

1941 establishments in New York (state)
1941 establishments in Ontario
Bridges completed in 1941
Bridges in Niagara Falls, New York
Bridges in Niagara Falls, Ontario
Bridges over the Niagara River
Canada–United States border crossings
Open-spandrel deck arch bridges in Canada
Open-spandrel deck arch bridges in the United States
Road bridges in New York (state)
Road bridges in Ontario
Toll bridges in Canada
Toll bridges in New York (state)
Steel bridges in Canada
Steel bridges in the United States
Concrete bridges in Canada
Concrete bridges in the United States